Bajan sticklicking (often spelled stick-licking) is the traditional form of stick fighting in Barbados.  It is a stick fighting martial art that has its roots from Africa, where two participants used fire-hardened wooden sticks, varying in length as weapons and carrying out fighting techniques. This art most likely came to Barbados during the 16th century through the Trans-Atlantic Slave Trade.

The earliest reference to stick fighting in the Caribbean was from a lithograph completed in Dominica in 1779 by an Italian artist, Agostino Brunias. In the image, there are two persons in the middle and other stick fighters and watchers gathered around them; some who are willing to fight and others that are old and experienced observing and refereeing the fight.

Stickfighting started to spread across the region with each culture having its own name.

During the African Diaspora, many Africans brought their cultures, traditions and even their own style of combat with them to the archipelago. As one can see from above, Africa was filled with many different forms of stickfighting and knowing that before their long transatlantic journey they were separated, one can deduce that after their arrival in Barbados, there was an evolution of each individual art form. Although not likely due to the lack of connectivity and interbreeding, Stick Licking in Barbados probably also had influences from English, Irish and Indian influences, given that these countries had long histories of stickfighting traditions.

Sticklicking is actively practiced in Barbados and is currently being taught with formal grading by the DBSS Sticklicking and Martial Arts Schools.

References

Afro-Barbadian
Stick-fighting
Barbadian culture
Sport in Barbados
North American martial arts